Ero s onoga svijeta (usually translated as Ero the Joker, literally Ero from the other world) is a comic opera in three acts by Jakov Gotovac, with a libretto by Milan Begović based on a folk tale. The genesis of the opera was at Vrlička Česma in the town of Vrlika, a hometown of Milan Begović.

According to Croatian musicologist Josip Andreis, Ero s onoga svijeta is "not only the most successful Croatian comic opera to this day, but also the only Croatian opera with a presence in the theaters abroad". American musicologist and music critic Ralph P. Locke described it as one of two major Croatian operas, alongside Nikola Šubić Zrinski.

Characters
 Marko, rich peasant, bass
 Doma, his second wife, mezzo-soprano
 Đula (Djula), Marko's daughter from the first marriage, soprano
 Mića (Ero), young man from the nearby village, tenor
 Sima, millman, baritone
 Shepherd boy, child soprano
 A young man, tenor
 girls (6 solos), women (8 solos), men, shepherds, fruit-merchants (4 solos), merchants (4 solos), children and other village people.

The opera takes place in a small town, somewhere in the plain at the foothill of Dinara mountain in Herzegovina, in early autumn.

Orchestra
 3 Flauti (III muta in Piccolo), 2 Oboi, Corno Inglese, 3 Clarinetti, 2 Fagotti (II muta in Contrafagotto)
 4 Corni in F, 3 Trombe in C, 3 Tromboni, Tuba
 Timpani, Percussioni, Arpa, Pianino
 I Violini, II Violini, Viole, Violoncelli, Contrabassi
 Sul palco: Organo

History

Composition of the opera began on October 10, 1932 and progressed in three stages, being finished on May 8, 1935. The first performance was on November 2, 1935 at the Croatian National Theatre in Zagreb, and the opera has since become the most performed work of South Slavic music literature.

The first performance was conducted by Gotovac himself, and he felt that the opera was nicely received by the audience.  In Novosti (hr),  described the opera in superlatives, and in Belgrade Pravda Stražičić shared this positive sentiment. An often-quoted dismissive opinion ("And again a Croatian composer wrote an opera in vain") allegedly found in Lujo Šafranek-Kavić's review in Jutarnji list, a Zagreb-based newspaper, has been found by recent research to be a fabrication. The actual review was generally very positive, with Šafranek-Kavić giving particular praise to Gotovac's score, while having reservations about the quality of the libretto.

Ero the Joker saw its first performance outside Yugoslavia in Brno, Czechoslovakia, translated into Czech in 1936, and after that it came back to the National Theater (Narodno pozorište) in Belgrade, Yugoslavia on April 17, 1937. It was next put on stage more than ten years later, on February 27, 1948, in the Serbian National Theatre (Srpsko narodno pozorište) in Novi Sad where it has been put on five times since. All totaled, Ero the Joker has found its way to the stages of more than 80 world theaters, and has been translated into 9 languages. Between 1935 and 2010 it has seen 660 performances in the Croatian National Theatre in Zagreb alone.

Gotovac and Begović found the basis for the opera's music and text in the folklore of many South Slavic groups, ranging from Dalmatian folklore (Opera Finale) to songs from Kosovo (opening chorus Duni mi, duni, lađane).

Synopsis

Act I

On the threshing floor of a rich peasant, Marko, young women are singing while threshing grain. Only master Marko's daughter Djula is sad: her mother had died and her stepmother, Doma, does not care for her at all. Djula's voice awakes Mića, a young man whom nobody knows.

While the women are comforting Djula and starting to sing again, Mića slides down from a big haystack on which he has been lying unnoticed – as if he had fallen from the sky. The superstitious women believe him when he says: "I am Ero from another world!"

He starts weaving a story about life "up there", delivering messages from their deceased loved ones. Djula's stepmother comes out and complains about their laziness. However, Mića sends her back into the kitchen by deceit, and thus, being left alone with Djula, tells her that her late mother has chosen him to be Djula's husband.

While they are discussing how to make her father, Marko, give his consent to their marriage, her father himself appears and drives Mića off, refusing to give shelter to a scoundrel.

However, Doma has also heard about this young man from another world and so, after Marko leaves, she makes inquiries after her late husband, Matija. Having heard that he is angry about her new marriage and her lack of respect for him, he adds that his pockets are empty. She, in a pang of conscience, gives Mića a sock full of gold coins to give to Matija when he sees him. Ero joyfully leaves. However, when Marko finds out about the money, he gathers men to go after Mića/Ero.

Act II

In the mill. Sima, the miller, mills and sings joyfully until women crowd: each one is in a rush and he does not know how to please them. When Doma arrives with Djula insisting to be served at once, a quarrel bursts out. Djula tries to calm her stepmother down, but she turns against her and leaves furiously. Djula laments after her ill fate; Sima is comforting her and she leaves with women.

But, here is Mića, running away. He disguises himself into a miller's apprentice and meets the pursuit crying: yes, he has seen the swindler running towards the mountains! They leave their horses and continue the chase on foot. Djula comes back and he assures her that he took the coins just to make a joke out of it, and he persuades her to run away with him. When Marko and men return, a young shepherd comes informing them that he saw Mića and Djula running away riding Marko's horse.

Act III

At the fair. Throng, howls and cheerfulness. Marko and Doma arrive quarrelling since he does not want to give her money for shopping. She leaves furiously. Sima, the miller, approaches Marko, telling him that Djula, in fact, married a rich boy from the neighbouring village and that they live a happy life.

She is longing after her father, but Mića does not want to come unless Marko invites him. Marko agrees to send for him, and when Mića and Djula arrive dressed up, people give them a warm reception.

And everything becomes clearer: following mother's advice, Mića, pretending to be a poor boy, went to find a girl who will love him for what he is. Now, he is ready to give back the horse and money and he only asks for Marko's blessing. Marko is happy for them and a big celebration begins, with a great round-dance in its finale.

Famous musical numbers
Vidjele ste, sidjoh odozgora - You've seen, I've come from above (Mića's aria - I Act)
Ja sam ti o Gjurgjevu dne - It was I who on St George's Day (Duetto of Mića i Djula - I Act)
Brblje voda, žrvnji rokću - Water's bubbling, millstone's grunting (Sima's arioso - II Act)
Majko, majčice - Mother, o sweet mother (Djula's aria - II Act)
Žene, đerdan, marame, šudari - Women, here's necklace, scarves, earrings (Sellers at Fair [chorus] - III Act)
Oj! Što su mome, Ero, za kradenje - Hey! Aren't girls for stealing (Entrance of Mića and Djula - III Act)
Ti znaš, Mića, kad sam djete bila - You know, Mića, when I was a child (Djula's aria - III Act)
Mene moja majka svjetovala - My mother advised me (Mića's arioso - III Act)
Što na nebu sja visoko - What's that shining high on heaven (Finale - Dance [chorus] - III Act)

References

Sources

 

Croatian-language operas
Operas by Jakov Gotovac
1935 operas
Operas